2016 The End is a 2017 apocalyptic Hindi comedy film written, produced and directed by Jaideep Chopra that stars Harshad Chopda, Priya Banerjee, Divyendu Sharma and Kiku Sharda.

Plot
Four friends living in Moradabad face different problems of their own. Sunny Shastri (Divyendu Sharma) is lazy and spunky. His father nags him. Rahul (Harshad Chopda) is the son of a rich businessman. Swami Assemanand (Kiku Sharda), as known as Asse, is the son of a self-proclaimed saint Swami Shraddhanand (Ashok Banthia), but is dismissive of his father's beliefs and pursues interests such as KFC and Chicken 65. Sheetal (Priya Banerjee) lives with her parents and has an aggressive boss, who makes a move on her every other day. The four meet for a movie and discuss their lives. On their way home, they encounter a scientist, Dr. Bhama (Tom Alter), who tells them the world is about to end as a giant meteorite is headed to destroy earth. First, they laugh it off, but believe him once they see it on his computer.

The next day, they are summoned by Inspector Pratap (Narendra Jha) as Bhama is missing and was last seen with the four of them. They share their encounter with him, but Pratap does not believe them. It is night by the time they leave the police station and head to the nearest club. They decide to enjoy whatever is left of their lives. Sheetal sees Rahul with another girl named Sandy and gets jealous. She gets drunk and starts dancing in a frenzy. In their drunken state, they steal a red sports car. Next morning, they realize the car has 10 crore cash in it and they head to Goa.

On their way they encounter craziness as Sunny is almost wedded to a village girl, while Asse is caught up by a queen (Supriya Karnik), who is a fan of Fifty Shades. They reach Goa and book the most expensive hotel. While in Goa, Rahul and Sheetal profess their love for each other while Asse and Sunny catch up.

When two days remain until the end, they head to the beach. They ride jet skis and para sails. They see a speedboat heading towards them and realize it is the man named Decosta (Rahul Roy) from the party. He is a gangster and the money and car they stole was his. He keeps the girls hostage and orders them to return his money. They go to the police for help, but to no avail. Finally, they bring the remaining money to the meeting point. As the gangster is about to shoot them, Inspector Pratap rescues them and gives them a life lesson on how they should really appreciate life and be thankful for what they have. Weddings follow.

Cast

Harshad Chopda as Rahul
Priya Banerjee as Sheetal
Divyendu Sharma as Sunny Shastri
Kiku Sharda as Swami Assemanand aka Asse
Narendra Jha as Police Inspector Pratap
 Supriya Karnik as Rani Sahiba
Tom Alter as Dr. Bhama
Jaideep Chopra as Riyaz
Rahul Roy as Don Decosta
Ashok Banthia as Swami Shraddhanand, Asse's Dad
Sushil Parashar as Shastri, Sunny's Dad
Ruben Israil as Rahul's Dad
Karishma Kapoor as Priya, Rahul's stepmother 
Pankaj Arora as Sheetal's boss
Mir Sarwar as Kashmeeri
Reyhna Malhotra as Sandy, Rahul's fiancé
 Sonia as Rupa Chaudhary / Rupa Sunny Shastri
Saleem Shiekh as Chuttan Kabari
Surabhi Singhwal as Razia, Asse's love interest 
Tereza Fiserova as Illeana, Sunny's love interest

References

External links

2017 films
2010s Hindi-language films
2010s science fiction comedy films
Apocalyptic films
Indian science fiction comedy films
2017 comedy films